This is a chronological list of editors of Horn Book Magazine.

Bertha Mahony Miller

Bertha Mahony Miller was the founding editor of Horn Book. She served in that post from 1924 to 1951.

Jennie Lindquist
Jennie D. Lindquist served as editor from 1951 to 1958. Before that, she held the title of managing editor under Bertha Mahony Miller.

Ruth Hill Viguers
Ruth Hill Viguers was the editor from 1958 to 1967. She was known to write stories concerning social realism.

Paul Heins
Paul Heins served as editor from 1967 to 1974 and was also a noted book critic. Before his tenure as editor, Heins was a teacher at the Boston English High School. During his editorship, he created the controversial Eleanor Cameron vs. Roald Dahl segment. He was also the author of two books: one being a retelling of Snow White illustrated by Trina Schart Hyman and the other Crosscurrents of Criticism: Horn Book Essays, 1968-1977.

Ethel Heins
Ethel L. Heins served as editor from 1974 to 1985. She added the sections "A Second Look" and "Out of Print — But Look in Your Library". Ms. Heins also wrote the book The Cat and the Cook and Other Fables of Krylov. She became editor as of the Magazine's 50th Anniversary edition.

Anita Silvey

Anita Silvey was editor of the magazine from 1985 to 1995, when she left to become the vice-president of Houghton Mifflin.

Roger Sutton
Roger Sutton became editor in 1996 and is the current editor as of 2019.

References

Horn